Sands Street was a station on the demolished BMT Myrtle Avenue Line. It was a large complex with two levels.

The lower level served trains going to Park Row in Manhattan via the Brooklyn Bridge Elevated Line. It had four tracks and two island platforms, with the outer platform faces serving streetcars.

The upper level had a terminal and a loop for terminating trains. The Sands Street Terminal had four tracks and three island platforms and a side platform located to the east. This was to the west of the loop tracks and platforms.

The Sands Street Loop had platforms on High Street (one island and two side platforms with two tracks) and on Sands Street (also two tracks and one island and two side platforms).

The next stop to the south was:
 Adams Street for trains that used the BMT Myrtle Avenue Line, including the BMT West End Line until 1916, the BMT Lexington Avenue Line, until the close of the station, the BMT Sea Beach Line's predecessor, until 1913, and the BMT Fifth Avenue Line until its closure in 1940 and
 Court Street for trains using the BMT Fulton Street Line, until 1940, including, until 1920, BMT Brighton Line trains.

The next stop and terminal to the north was Park Row for trains serving Manhattan. Trains on the upper level loop terminated at Sands Street.

It closed on March 5, 1944.

References

External links
 
 
Sands Street BMT Station (NYCSubway.org)
Long Island Rail Road Odds & Ends; Scroll down for Sands Street Terminal (TrainsAreFun)

Defunct BMT Myrtle Avenue Line stations
Defunct BMT Fulton Street Line stations
Railway stations in the United States opened in 1888
Railway stations closed in 1944